Shahe station may refer to:

Shahe railway station, in Changping District, Beijing, China
Shahe station (Beijing Subway), in Changping District, Beijing, China
Shahe station (Guangzhou Metro), future interchange station on Line 6 and Line 11 of Guangzhou Metro, in Tianhe District, Guangzhou, Guangdong Province, China